Nowy Głuchówek  is a village in the administrative district of Gmina Rawa Mazowiecka, within Rawa County, Łódź Voivodeship, in central Poland.

It is located 3.5 km south of Rawa Mazowiecka and 64 km east of Łódź, on the main Krakow road (route D726).

It takes its name "New Głuchówek" from the neighbouring village of Głuchówek.

References

Villages in Rawa County